Lac du Bonnet Airport , also known as Lac du Bonnet Regional Airport, is a registered aerodrome located  northeast of Lac du Bonnet, Manitoba, Canada.

See also
Lac du Bonnet (North) Water Aerodrome
Bird River (Lac du Bonnet) Airport
Bird River Water Aerodrome

References

External links
 Lac du Bonnet Regional Airport in COPA's Places to Fly

Registered aerodromes in Manitoba

Transport in Eastman Region, Manitoba